Torbjørn Rocks is a group of rocks lying in the mouth of Lunde Glacier in the Mühlig-Hofmann Mountains of Queen Maud Land. They were plotted from surveys and air photos by the Norwegian Antarctic Expedition (1956–60) and named for Torbjørn Lunde, the glaciologist with the expedition.

References

Rock formations of Queen Maud Land
Princess Astrid Coast